Doll Revolution is the fourth studio album by American pop rock band The Bangles. It was released in March 2003 in Europe and Japan, and in September of that year in the United States. It is the first album by the group since their 1998 reunion.

Background

The Bangles reunited in 1999, released the song "Get the Girl" on the Austin Powers 2: The Spy Who Shagged Me soundtrack, and toured over the next four years to finance their next record. To release the album, the group resurrected their label Down Kiddie Records, on which their debut single "Getting Out of Hand" appeared in 1981. Doll Revolution was first released on CD in Europe and Japan in March 2003, and distributed through deals with the EMI subsidiary Liberty Records and Victor. The record came out in the US in September of that year, on Koch Records. It was also released on cassette in Thailand and Indonesia, and on CD in the UK, Australia, South Africa and Taiwan.

Doll Revolution contains 15 songs and is the group's lengthiest album. All tracks were composed or co-written by members of the Bangles, with the exception of "Tear Off Your Own Head," written by Elvis Costello and debuting on his 2002 album When I Was Cruel. Previous versions of some of the songs were released and performed by band members with other groups they worked with: "Mixed Messages" by Vicki Peterson and "The Rain Song," written by Vicki and Susan Cowsill, both appeared on Continental Drifters albums; while "Ask Me No Questions," written by Debbi Peterson, was released by her band Kindred Spirit. "Nickel Romeo" and "Between The Two", while never released, had been debuted by Michael Steele with her band Crash Wisdom in live shows in 1994.

The album spawned three singles. The lead single, "Something That You Said", reached No. 38 in the UK, and was a minor hit elsewhere in Europe. "Tear Off Your Own Head (It's a Doll Revolution)" and "I Will Take Care of You" were next released as singles, the latter reaching No. 79 in the UK. All three songs had lead vocals by Susanna Hoffs.

In the US, a bonus DVD was included with one version of the album, containing interviews, a photo gallery and the "Something That You Said" video. The Japanese CD in 2003 included as bonus tracks both songs from the Bangs'/Bangles' 1981 debut 7-inch single, "Getting Out of Hand" and "Call on Me" (the first time they had been released on CD), as well as an alternate mix of "Something That You Said." All of these tracks are featured on the audio player on the US bonus DVD as well.

In 2020 and 2021, the album was reissued in a 2-LP format in the US on four different colored vinyl editions by Real Gone Music.

Track listing

Personnel
 Produced by Brad Wood & the Bangles

The Bangles
 Susanna Hoffs – acoustic guitar, electric guitar, vocals
 Debbi Peterson – drums, acoustic guitar, percussion, vocals
 Vicki Peterson – guitar, acoustic guitar, electric guitar, mandolin, vocals
 Michael Steele – bass, acoustic guitar, electric guitar, vocals

Additional musicians
 Dillon O'Brian – acoustic & electric guitars, Wurlitzer electric piano
 Bangle Boys Choir (Dave Grohl, John Crooke & Chick Wolverton) – background vocals
 Greg Hilfman & Chick Wolverton – keyboards
 Greg Leisz – lap & pedal steel
 Peter Holsapple – mandolin, accordion & keyboards
 Tim Russell – acoustic guitar and background vocals on "Here Right Now"
 R. Walt Vincent – harmonium
 David Campbell – strings arranger on "I Will Take Care of You"
 Leah Katz – viola on "I Will Take Care of You"
 Melissa Reiner & Michael Nicholson – violin on "I Will Take Care of You"
 Guenevere Measham – cello on "I Will Take Care of You"

Charts

References

External links

2003 albums
The Bangles albums
Albums produced by Brad Wood
Liberty Records albums
Victor Entertainment albums